Madisonville Municipal Airport  is a city-owned public-use airport located five nautical miles (9 km) northeast of the central business district of Madisonville, a city in Hopkins County, Kentucky, United States.

Facilities and aircraft
It has one asphalt paved runway designated 5/23 which measures 6,050 by 100 feet (1,844 x 30 m).

For the 12-month period ending October 14, 2008, the airport had 17,054 aircraft operations, an average of 46 per day: 78% general aviation, 19% air taxi and 3% military. At that time there were 17 aircraft based at this airport:
88% single-engine, 6% multi-engine and 6% jet.

References

External links
 Aerial photo as of 28 February 1997 from USGS The National Map
 
 

Airports in Kentucky
Buildings and structures in Hopkins County, Kentucky
Transportation in Hopkins County, Kentucky